The Skywalk Cayenne is a German single-place paraglider that was designed and produced by Skywalk GmbH & Co. KG of Grassau, Bavaria. Introduced in 2003, it remained in production through 2016 as the Cayenne 5.

Design and development
The aircraft was designed as an intermediate sports class glider.

Since its introduction in 2003, the Cayenne has progressed through five generations of models, the Cayenne, Cayenne 2, 3, 4 and 5, each improving on the last. The models are each named for their relative size.

The Cayenne 5's upper surface is made from Porcher Sport Skytex 38 Universal fabric and lower surface from Porcher Sport Skytex 32 Universal. The ribs and bands are Porcher Sport Skytex 32 hard. The main lines are made from	Liros PPSL 160, Edelrid 8000U-90, the middle lines from Liros DC 60, Edelrid 8000U-90 and the top lines	from Edelrid 8000U-50, Edelrid 9200-30. The brake lines are made from Liros DFLP200/32, Edelrid 9200-30 and the risers are constructed of Cousin Freres  polyester strapping.

Variants

Cayenne
Cayenne XS
Extra small-sized model for lighter pilots. The glider model is DHV 2 certified.
Cayenne S
Small-sized model for lighter pilots. The glider model is DHV 2 certified.
Cayenne M
Mid-sized model for medium-weight pilots. The glider model is DHV 2 certified.
Cayenne L
Large-sized model for heavier pilots. The glider model is DHV 2 certified.

Cayenne 5
Cayenne 5 XS
Extra small-sized model for lighter pilots. The glider model is EN-C certified.
Cayenne 5 S
Small-sized model for lighter pilots. The glider model is EN-C certified.
Cayenne 5 M
Mid-sized model for medium-weight pilots. The glider model is EN-C certified.
Cayenne 5 L
Large-sized model for heavier pilots. The glider model is EN-C certified.

Specifications (Cayenne M)

See also
Skywalk Hype

References

External links

Cayenne
Paragliders